"Pause" is a song from American rapper Pitbull's sixth studio album, Planet Pit. The song was written by Armando C. Perez, Adrian Santalla, Abdesamad Ben Abdelouahid, Ari Kalimi and Urales Vargas, and it was produced by DJ Buddha. The song peaked at number 33 on the New Zealand Singles Chart.

"Pause" was used to promote the Zumba fitness program. It is also the theme song of the video game Zumba Fitness 2.

Track listing
Album version
"Pause" – 3:01
Single version
"Pause (Zumba Mix)" – 3:00

Credits and personnel
Lead vocals – Pitbull
Producers – Dj Buddha
Lyrics – Armando C. Perez, Adrian Santalla, Abdesamad Ben Abdelouahid, Ari Kalimi, Urales Vargas
Label: Polo Grounds, J Records, RCA Records, Mr. 305

In other media
The song was played in the 2014 film Mr. Peabody & Sherman

Charts

References 

2011 songs
2011 singles
Pitbull (rapper) songs
Songs written by Pitbull (rapper)
Songs written by DJ Buddha
Song recordings produced by DJ Buddha